Nagaland is a landlocked state in the northeastern region of India. It is bordered by the Indian states of Arunachal Pradesh to the north, Assam to the west, Manipur to the south, and the Sagaing Region of Myanmar (Burma) to the east. Its capital city is Kohima and its largest city is the twin Chümoukedima–Dimapur.

Nagaland became the 16th state of India on December 1, 1963. It is home to a rich variety of natural, cultural, and environmental resources.

Nagaland is a mountainous state and lies between the parallels of 95 and 94 degrees eastern longitude and 25.2 and 27.0 degrees latitude north. The high-profile Dzüko Valley is located at Viswema, in the southern region of the state.

The state has significant resources of natural minerals, petroleum, and hydropower, with agriculture as the state's most important economic activity, accounting for over 70% of its economy. Other significant activities include forestry, tourism, insurance, real estate, horticulture, and miscellaneous cottage industries.

The state has experienced insurgency and inter-ethnic conflict since the 1950s, limiting its economic development.

Names 
The origin of the word 'Naga' is unclear. A popularly accepted, but controversial, view is that it originated from the Burmese word Na-Ka' or 'Naga', meaning "people with earrings." Others suggest it means pierced noses. In Burmese, Naka and Naga are pronounced the same way.

Before the arrival of European colonialism in South Asia, there had been many wars, persecution and raids from Burma on the Nagas, Meiteis and others in India's northeast. The invaders came for "head hunting" and to seek wealth and captives from these tribes and ethnic groups. When the British inquired with Burmese guides about the people living in the northern Himalayas, they were told 'Naka'. This was recorded as 'Naga' and has been in use thereafter.

History

Prehistory 
The ancient history of the Nagas is unclear. Ethnic groups migrated at different times, each settling in the northeastern part of present India and establishing their respective sovereign mountain terrains and village states. There are no records of whether they came from the northern Mongolian region, southeast Asia, or southwest China, except that their origins are from the east of India, and historical records show the present-day Naga people settled before the arrival of the Ahoms in 1228 CE.

British administration 

With the arrival of the British East India Company in the early 19th century, followed by the British Raj, Britain expanded its domain over the whole of South Asia, including the Naga Hills. The first Europeans to enter the hills were Captain Francis Jenkins and Lieutenant Robert Pemberton in 1832. The early contact with the Naga ethnic groups was characterized by suspicion and conflict. The colonial in Assam, such as tea estates and other trading posts fought raids from the ethnic groups who were known for their bravery and "head hunting" practices. To put an end to these raids, the British troops recorded 10 military expeditions between 1839 and 1850. In February 1851, at the bloody Battle of Kikrüma, people died on both the British side and the Kikrüma (Naga) side; in the days after the battle, inter-ethnic warfare followed that led to more bloodshed. After that war, the British adopted a policy of caution and non-interference with Naga ethnic groups. 

Despite this, colonists continued to move into Naga peoples' territory. Between 1851 and 1865, Naga ethnic groups continued to raid the British in Assam. The British India Government took over the holdings of the East Indian Company following the Indian Rebellion of 1857. The failings and atrocities of the East Indian Company led the British Crown to review its governance structure throughout South Asia including its northeastern region. In 1866, the British India administration established a post at Samaguting with the explicit goal of ending intertribal warfare and tribal raids on property and personnel. 

In 1869, Captain Butler was appointed to lead and consolidate the British presence in the Nagaland Hills. In 1878, the headquarters were transferred to Kohima — creating a city that remains an important center of administration, commerce, and culture for Nagaland.

On 4 October 1879, British political agent G. H. Damant went to Khonoma with troops, where he was shot dead with 35 of his team. Kohima was subsequently attacked and the stockade looted. This violence led to a determined effort by the British Raj to return and respond. The subsequent defeat of Khonoma marked the end of serious and persistent ultimatums in the Naga Hills.

Between 1880 and 1922, the British administration consolidated their position over a large area of the Naga Hills and integrated it into its Assam operations. The British administration enforced the rupee as the currency for economic activity and a system of structured ethnic government that was very different than historic social governance practices. These developments triggered profound social changes among the Naga people. In 1926, it became a part of Pakokku Hill Tracts Districts of Burma until 4 January 1948.

In parallel, since the mid-19th century, Christian missionaries from the United States and Europe, stationed in India, reached into Nagaland and neighbouring states, converting Nagaland's Naga ethnic groups from animism to Christianity.

World War II 

In 1944, during World War II, the Japanese Army, with the help of the Indian National Army led by Netaji Subhashchandra Bose, invaded through Burma and attempted to take India through Kohima. The population was evacuated. British India soldiers defended the area of Kohima and having lost many of their original force were relieved by British in June 1944.
Together the British and Indian troops successfully repelled the Japanese troops.
The battle was fought from 4 April to 22 June 1944 from the town of Kohima, coordinated with action at Imphal, Manipur. The Indian National Army lost half their numbers, many through starvation, and were forced to withdraw through Burma.

There is the World War II Cemetery, and the War Museum, in honour of those who died during World War II during the fighting between the British Empire and Japanese troops. Nearly 4,000 British Empire troops died, along with 3,000 Japanese. Many of those who died were Naga people, particularly the Angami Nagas. Near the memorial is the Kohima Cathedral, on Aradura Hill, built with funds from the families and friends of deceased Japanese soldiers. Prayers are held in Kohima for peace and in memory of the fallen of both sides of the battle.

Naga national awakening 

In 1929, a memorandum was submitted to the Simon Statutory Commission, requesting that the Nagas be exempt from reforms and new taxes proposed in British India, should be left alone to determine their own future. This Naga Memorandum stated,

From 1929 to 1935, the understanding of sovereignty by Nagas was 'self-rule' based on the traditional territorial definition. From 1935 to 1945, Nagas were merely asking for autonomy within Assam. In response to the Naga memorandum to Simon Commission, the British House of Commons decreed that the Naga Hills ought to be kept outside the purview of the New Constitution; the Government of India Act, 1935 and ordered Naga areas as Excluded Area; meaning outside the administration of British India government. Thereafter from 1 April 1937, it was brought under the direct administration of the Crown through Her Majesty's representative; the Governor of Assam province.

The Naga Memorandum submitted by the Naga Club (which later became the Naga National Council) to the Simon Commission explicitly stated, 'to leave us alone to determine ourselves as in ancient times.' In February 1946, the Naga Club officially took shape into a unified Naga National Council in Wokha. In June 1946, the Naga National Council submitted a four-point memorandum to officials discussing the independence of India from British colonial rule. The memorandum strongly protested against the grouping of Assam with Bengal and asserted that Naga Hills should be constitutionally included in an autonomous Assam, in a free India, with local autonomy, due safeguards and separate electorate for the Nagas.

Jawaharlal Nehru replied to the memorandum and welcomed the Nagas to join the Union of India promising local autonomy and safeguards. On 9 April 1946, the Naga National Council (NNC) submitted a memorandum to the British Cabinet Mission during its visit to Delhi. The crux of the memorandum stated that: "Naga future would not be bound by any arbitrary decision of the British Government and no recommendation would be accepted without consultation".

In June 1946, the NNC submitted a four-point memorandum signed by T. Sakhrie; the then Secretary of NNC, to the still-visiting British Cabinet Mission. The memorandum stated that:
1. The NNC stands for the solidarity of all Nagas, including those in un-administered areas;
2. The Council protests against the grouping of Assam with Bengal;
3. The Naga Hills should be constitutionally included in an autonomous Assam, in a free India, with local autonomy and due safeguards for the interests of the Nagas;
4. The Naga tribes should have a separate electorate.

On 1 August 1946, Nehru, President of the Indian National Congress Party in his reply to the memorandum, appealed to the Nagas to join the Union of India promising local autonomy and safeguards in a wide-ranging area of administration. It was after 1946 only that the Nagas had asserted their inalienable right to be a separate nation and an absolute right to live independently.

After the independence of India in 1947, the area remained a part of the province of Assam. Nationalist activities arose amongst a section of the Nagas. Phizo-led Naga National Council demanded a political union of their ancestral and native groups. The movement led to a series of violent incidents, that damaged government and civil infrastructure, attacked government officials and civilians. The central government sent the Indian Army in 1955, to restore order. In 1957, an agreement was reached between Naga leaders and the Indian government, creating a single separate region of the Naga Hills. The Tuensang frontier was united with this single political region, Naga Hills Tuensang Area (NHTA), and it became a union territory directly administered by the central government with a large degree of autonomy. This was not satisfactory to the Nagas, however, and agitation with violence increased across the state – including attacks on army and government institutions, banks, as well as non-payment of taxes. In July 1960, following discussion between Prime Minister Nehru and the leaders of the Naga People Convention (NPC), a 16-point agreement was arrived at whereby the Government of India recognised the formation of Nagaland as a full-fledged state within the Union of India.

Nagaland statehood and late 20th century 
Accordingly, the territory was placed under the Nagaland Transitional Provisions Regulation, 1961 which provided for an Interim body consisting of 45 members to be elected by tribes according to the customs, traditions and usage of the respective tribes. Subsequently, Nagaland attained statehood with the enactment of the state of Nagaland Act in 1962 by the Parliament. The interim body was dissolved on 30 November 1963 and the state of Nagaland was formally inaugurated on 1 December 1963 and Kohima was declared as the state capital. After elections in January 1964, the first democratically elected Nagaland Legislative Assembly was constituted on 11 February 1964.
The rebel activity continued in many Naga inhabited areas both in India and Burma. Cease-fires were announced and negotiations continued, but this did little to stop the violence. In March 1975, a direct presidential rule was imposed by the then Prime Minister Indira Gandhi on the state. In November 1975, some leaders of largest rebellion groups agreed to lay down their arms and accept the Indian constitution, a small group did not agree and continued their insurgent activity. The Nagaland Baptist Church Council played an important role by initiating peace efforts in the 1960s. This took concrete and positive shape during its Convention in early 1964. It formed the Nagaland Peace Council in 1972. However, these efforts have not completely ended the inter-factional violence.

21st century 
In 2004, two powerful bombs were set off on the same day and struck the Dimapur Railway Station and the Hong Kong Market, resulting in 30 deaths and wounding over 100 others in the deadliest terrorist attack in Nagaland to date.

Over the 5-year period of 2009 to 2013, between 0 and 11 civilians died per year in Nagaland from rebellion related activity (or less than 1 death per 100,000 people), and between 3 and 55 militants died per year in inter-factional killings (or between 0 and 3 deaths per 100,000 people).

In early 2017, Nagaland goes into a state of civil unrest and protests in response to the announcement to implement 33% women's reservation in the Civic Elections.

The most recent Nagaland Legislative Assembly election took place on February 27, 2018 to elect the Members of the Legislative Assembly (MLA) in 59 out of the 60 Assembly Constituencies in the state. The scheduled election in Northern Angami II constituency did not take place as only incumbent MLA Neiphiu Rio was nominated and was therefore declared elected unopposed. A voter turnout of 75% was observed in the 2018 election.

On December 4, 2021, a unit of the 21st Para Special Forces of the Indian Army killed six civilian labourers near Oting Village in the Mon District of Nagaland. Eight more civilians and a soldier were killed in subsequent violence. The incident was widely condemned, with many calling out to repeal and revoke the Armed Forces Special Powers Act.

Geography 

Nagaland lies between 93°20'E and 95°15'E longitude and between 25°6'N and 27°4'N latitude. It is largely a mountainous state. Rivers such as the Doyang and Diphu to the north, the Barak river in the southwest, dissect the entire state.

Twenty percent of the total land area of the state is covered with wooded forest, a haven for flora and fauna. The evergreen tropical and subtropical forests are found in strategic pockets in the state.

Climate 
Nagaland has a largely monsoon climate with high humidity levels. In winter, temperatures do not generally drop below , but frost is common at high elevations. Summer is the shortest season in the state, lasting only a few months. Winter often arrives early, with bitter cold and dry weather striking certain regions of the state. Strong northwest winds blow across the state during the months of February and March. Snowfall happens in the higher elevations, but it is rare and most of the state does not witness any snow.

Flora and fauna 

About one-sixth of Nagaland is covered by tropical and sub-tropical evergreen forests—including palms, bamboo, rattan as well as timber and mahogany forests. While some forest areas have been cleared for jhum cultivation, many scrub forests, high grass, and reeds. Ntangki National Park, Pulie Badze Wildlife Sanctuary, Fakim Wildlife Sanctuary and Rangapahar Reserve Forest are some natural reserves in Nagaland. Some noteworthy mammals found in Nagaland include the slow loris, Assamese macaque, pig-tailed macaque, stump-tailed macaque, rhesus macaque, capped langur, hoolock gibbon, Himalayan black bear, dhole, occasional Bengal tiger, Indian leopard, clouded leopard, marbled cat, golden cat, Indian elephants, gaur, red serow, sambar, Chinese pangolin, Malayan porcupine, Asiatic brush-tailed porcupine, and Hoary bamboo rats

Nagaland has a rich birdlife with more than 490 species. The great Indian hornbill has a place in Naga culture. Blyth's tragopan, a vulnerable species of galliform, is the state bird of Nagaland. It is sighted in Mount Japfü and Dzüko Valley of Kohima District, Satoi range in Zünheboto District and Pfütsero in Phek District. The state is also known as the "falcon capital of the world."

Mithun (a semi-domesticated gaur) is the state animal of Nagaland and has been adopted as the official seal of the Government of Nagaland. It is ritually the most valued species in the state. To conserve and protect this animal in the northeast, the National Research Centre on Mithun (NRCM) was established by the Indian Council of Agricultural Research (ICAR) in 1988.

Nagaland is home to 396 species of orchids, belonging to 92 genera of which 54 having horticultural and medicinal economic importance. Kopou (pictured right) is also used for festive hairstyle decoration by women in India's northeast.
Rhododendron is the state flower. The state has at least four species which is endemic to the state.

Geology 

Several preliminary studies indicate significant recoverable reserves of petroleum and natural gas. Limestone, marble and other decorative stone reserves are plentiful, and other as yet unexploited minerals include iron, nickel, chromium, and cobalt.

Urbanisation 
The Nagaland population is largely rural with 71.14% living in rural regions in 2011. Census reports up to 1951 listed just one settlement in Nagaland as a town, the capital Kohima. The next two settlements, Dimapur and Mokokchung were listed as towns from 1961. Four more towns appeared in 1981, Tuensang, Wokha, Mon and Zünheboto.

The relatively slow rate of urbanisation in Nagaland was described in the 1980s as being an effect of (a) the largely administrative roles of the towns, except for Dimapur which had a more diversified economy, and (b) a low level of mobility among the tribes of Nagaland, scheduled tribes constituting nearly 90% of the population.

Demographics

Population 

The population of Nagaland consists of almost 2.2 million people, of which 1.04 million are males and 0.95 million females. Among its districts, Dimapur has the largest population (379,769), followed by Kohima (270,063). The least populated district is Longleng (50,593). 75% of the population lives in the rural areas. As of 2013, about 10% of rural population is below the poverty line; among the people living in urban areas 4.3% of them are below the poverty line.

The state showed a population drop between 2001 census to 2011 census, the only state to show a population drop in the census. This has been attributed, by scholars, to incorrect counting in past censuses; the 2011 census in Nagaland is considered most reliable so far.

The largest urban agglomerations are centred upon Dimapur (122,834) and Kohima (115,283).
Other major towns (and 2011 census populations) are Tuensang (36,774), Mokokchung (35,913), Wokha (35,004), Mon (26,328), Chümoukedima (25,885), Zünheboto (22,633), Kiphire (16,487), Kuda (16,108), Kohima Village (15,734), Phek (14,204), Pfütsero (10,371) and Diphupar 'A' (10,246).

Ethnic groups 
The state is home to 17 major ethnic groups— Angami, Ao, Chakhesang, Chang, Kachari, Khiamniungan, Konyak, Kuki, Lotha, Phom, Pochury, Rengma, Sangtam, Sümi, Tikhir, Yimkhiung and Zeme-Liangmai (Zeliang).

Some other minor tribes or subtribes are Garo, Mikir, Chirr, Makury, and Rongmei.

There are also sizable populations of non-Naga communities like Bengalis, Marwaris, Nepalis, Punjabis and others living mostly around Dimapur City.

Languages 

Naga people form the majority of the population. According to the 2011 census there are 2 million people living in Nagaland. The Naga people number around 1.8 million in the state, constituting over 90% of the population. These belong mostly to the Sino-Tibetan language family. Shafer came up with his own classification system for languages found in and around Nagaland. Each ethnic group has one or more dialects that are unintelligible to others.

In 1967, the Nagaland Assembly proclaimed Indian English as the official language of Nagaland and it is the medium for education in Nagaland. Other than English, Nagamese, a creole language based on Assamese, is widely spoken.

The major languages spoken as per the 2011 census are Konyak (244,135), Ao (231,084), Lotha (177,488), Angami (151,883), Chokri (91,010), Sangtam (75,841), Bengali (74,753), Zeme (71,954; covering Zeliang, 60,399 and Zemi, 11,165), Yimkhiungrü (74,156), Chang (65,632), Khiamniungan (61,906), Rengma (61,537), Phom (53,674), Nepali (43,481), Kheza (34,218), Pochury (21,446), Kuki (18,391), Chakhesang (17,919), Assamese (17,201), Bodo (12,243; covering Bodo 7,372 and Dimasa 4,871), Manipuri (9,511), Sema (8,268), etc.

Religion

Christianity 

The state's population is 1.978 million, out of which over 90% are Abrahamics in general and 88% are Christians in particular. The census of 2011 recorded the state's Christian population at 1,739,651, making it one of the three Christian-majority states in India along with Meghalaya and Mizoram. The state has a very high church attendance rate in both urban and rural areas. Huge churches dominate the skylines of Kohima, Chümoukedima, Dimapur, Wokha and Mokokchung.

Nagaland is known as "the only predominantly Baptist State in the World" and "the most Baptist State in the World." Catholics, Revivalists, Pentecostals and Seventh-day Adventist are the other Christian denominations. Catholics are found in significant numbers in parts of Kohima District, Wokha District, Phek District and as well as in the urban areas of Kohima and Dimapur.

Christianity arrived in Nagaland in the early 19th century. The American Baptist Naga mission grew out of the Assam mission in 1836. Miles Bronson, Nathan Brown and other Christian missionaries working out of Jaipur to bring Christianity to the Indian subcontinent, saw the opportunity for gaining converts since many parts of India's northeast was principally animist and folk religion-driven. Along with other tribal regions of the northeast, the people of Nagaland converted to Christianity. However, the conversions have been marked by high rates of changing denomination ever since. After having converted to Christianity, people do not feel bound to any one sect and tend to switch affiliation between denominations.

Hinduism 

Hinduism is the second largest religion in Nagaland. Hindus are concentrated mainly in Dimapur District (28.75%) and Kohima District (9.51%). Dimapur Kalibari is a famous temple in Nagaland.

Other religions
There are also folk religions practiced by some Nagas, specially among the Zeliangrongs (Zemes and Rongmeis) but few among other Naga ethnic groups.

Government 

The governor is the constitutional head of state, representative of the President of India. He possesses largely ceremonial responsibilities apart from law and order responsibilities.

The Legislative Assembly of Nagaland (Vidhan Sabha) is the real executive and legislative body of the state. The 60-member Vidhan Sabha – all elected members of the legislature – forms the government executive and is led by the Chief minister. Nagaland has been granted a great degree of state autonomy, like other Indian States as well as special powers and autonomy for Naga ethnic groups to conduct their own affairs. Each ethnic group has a hierarchy of councils at the village, range, and ethnic levels dealing with local disputes.

Elections 

The Democratic Alliance of Nagaland (DAN) is a state level coalition of political parties. It headed the government with the Bharatiya Janata Party (BJP) and Janata Dal (United) (JDU). It was formed in 2003 after the Nagaland Legislative Assembly election, with the Naga People's Front (NPF), and the BJP. The alliance was in power in Nagaland from 2003 to 2018.

The NDPP–BJP–NPF alliance led UDA government has won the majority in 2018 Nagaland Legislative Assembly election and has been in power since then.

Administrative districts 

When created in 1963 the state of Nagaland was divided into just three districts, Kohima District, Mokokchung District and Tuensang District. By a process of subdivision that number increased to seven in 1973, to eleven by 2004, and the most recent districts to be created, Chümoukedima District, Niuland District and Tseminyü District in 2021 and Shamator District in 2022, brought the total number to sixteen districts. The most populous and the most urbanized is Dimapur District, with seven times the inhabitants of Longleng District, the least populous. Noklak District is considered entirely rural. Dimapur District is also at the lowest elevation, Zünheboto District being highest in the mountains.

Districts 
The sixteen districts of Nagaland, and their headquarters, 2011 census populations, areas and elevations (of the seat) are:

Economy 
Nagaland's GSDP grew at 9.9% compounded annually for a decade, thus more than doubling the per capita income.

Nagaland has a literacy rate of 80.1 percent. The majority of the population in the state speaks English, which is the official language of the state. The state offers technical and medical education. Nevertheless, agriculture and forestry contribute a majority of Nagaland's Gross Domestic Product. The state is rich in mineral resources such as coal, limestone, iron, nickel, cobalt, chromium, and marble. Nagaland has a recoverable reserve of limestone of 1,000 million tonnes plus a largely untapped resource of marble and handicraft stone.

Most of the state's population, about 68 percent, depends on rural cultivation. The main crops are rice, millet, maize, and pulses. Cash crops, like sugarcane and potato, are also grown in some parts.

Plantation crops such as premium coffee, cardamom, and tea are grown in hilly areas in small quantities with large growth potential. Most people cultivate rice as it is the main staple diet of the people. About 80% of the cropped area is dedicated to rice. Oilseeds is another, higher income crop gaining ground in Nagaland. The farm productivity for all crops is low, compared to other Indian states, suggesting a significant opportunity for farmer income increase. Currently, the Jhum to Terraced cultivation ratio is 4:3; where Jhum is the local name for cut-and-burn shift farming. Jhum farming is ancient, causes a lot of pollution and soil damage, yet accounts for the majority of the farmed area. The state does not produce enough food and depends on the trade of food from other states of India.

Forestry is also an important source of income. Cottage industries such as weaving, woodwork, and pottery are an important source of revenue.

Tourism has a lot of potentials but was largely limited due to insurgency and concern of terrorist violence over the last five decades. More recently, a number of Small Medium Enterprises and private sector companies have actively promoted Nagaland tourism, helping initiate a growing tourism market. Tourism experts contend that the state's uniqueness and strategic location in northeast India give Nagaland an advantage in tapping into the tourism sector for economic growth.

Nagaland's gross state domestic product for 2004 is estimated at $1.4 billion in current prices.

The state generates 87.98 MU compared to a demand for 242.88 MU. This deficit requires Nagaland to buy power. The state has significant hydroelectric potential, which if realised could make the state a power surplus state. In terms of power distribution, every village and town, and almost every household has an electricity connection; but, this infrastructure is not effective given the power shortage in the state.

Natural resources 
After a gap of almost 20 years, Nagaland state Chief Minister, T. R. Zeliang launched the resumption of oil exploration in Changpang and Tsori areas, under Wokha District in July 2014. The exploration will be carried out by the Metropolitan Oil & Gas Pvt. Ltd. Zeliang has alleged failures and disputed payments made to the statement made by the previous explorer, the state-owned Oil and Natural Gas Corporation (ONGC).

Transportation 
Nagaland's rugged and mountainous landscape presents a major challenge to the infrastructural development of transport. Roads are the backbone of Nagaland's transportation network. The state has over 15,000 km of surfaced roads, but these are not satisfactorily maintained given the weather damage. Yet, in terms of population served for each kilometre of surfaced road, Nagaland is the second best state in the region after Arunachal Pradesh.

Roadways

International highways passing through Nagaland 

  Asian Highway 1 
  Asian Highway 2

National highways in Nagaland 
  : Dibrugarh–Tuli–Changtongya–Mokokchung–Wokha–Tseminyü–Kohima–Viswema–Imphal
  : Dabaka–Dimapur–Chümoukedima–Kohima–Kigwema–Chizami–Jessami
  : Dimapur–Numaligarh
  : Dimapur–Rüzaphema–Pimla–Jalukie–Peren–Maram
  : Mokokchung–Tuensang–Meluri–Jessami–Imphal
  : Changtongya–Longleng–Mon–Tizit–Sapekhati
  : Longleng–Tuensang

State highways in Nagaland 
 Dimapur–Mokokchung–Chozuba–Zunheboto
 Kohima–Meluri via Chakhabama
 Mokokchung–Mariani
 Mokokchung–Tuensang
 Namtola–Mon
 Tuensang–Mon–Naginimora
 Tuensang–Kiphire–Meluri
 Wokha–Merapani Road

Airways 

Dimapur Airport, is the sole airport in Nagaland with scheduled commercial services to Kolkata,
Guwahati, Imphal, and Dibrugarh. The airport's asphalt runway is 7513 feet long, at an elevation of 487 feet. Alongside Dimapur Airport another airport is planned.

Railway 
Nagaland was first connected to the railway line in 1903 when the 1,000 mm (3 ft 3 3⁄8 in) wide metre-gauge railway track earlier laid by Assam Bengal Railway from Chittagong to Lumding was extended to Tinsukia on the Dibru–Sadiya line.

The railway network in the state is minimal with the Dimapur railway station on the Lumding–Dibrugarh rail section as the only railway station in Nagaland. Broad-gauge lines run , National Highway roads , and state roads .

As part of the Indian Railways' ambitious plan to connect all the capitals of the north-eastern states by broad-gauge rail link, railway minister Suresh Prabhu laid the foundation stone of the 88-km rail line to bring Kohima (Dhansiri–Zubza line), the capital of Nagaland, on the railway map of India. The project will be executed in three phases.
 The first phase involves the construction of Dhansiri to Shokhuvi (16 km) line.
 The second phase involves Shokhuvi to Khaibong (30 km).
 The third phase involves Khaibong to Zubza (45 km).

The entire phase of the project is targeted for completion by 2026.

Culture 

The 17 main ethnic groups of Nagaland are Angami–Chakhesang, Ao, Chang, Dimasa Kachari, Khiamniungan, Konyak, Kuki, Lotha, Phom, Pochury, Rengma, Sangtam, Sümi, Tikhir, Yimkhiung and Zeliang. The Angami–Chakhesangs, Aos, Konyaks, Lothas and Sümis are the largest Naga ethnic groups.

Ethnic and clan traditions and loyalties play an important part in the life of Nagas. Weaving is a traditional art handed down through generations in Nagaland. Each Naga ethnic groups has unique designs and colours, producing shawls, shoulder bags, decorative spears, table mats, wood carvings, and bamboo works. Among many tribes, the design of the shawl denotes the social status of the wearer. Some of the more known shawls include tsüngkotepsü and rongsü of the Aos; sütam, ethasü, longpensü of the Lothas; süpong of the Sangtams, rongkhim and tsüngrem khim of the Yimkhiungs; the Angami lohe shawls with thick embroidered animal motifs; etc.

Folk songs and dances are essential ingredients of the traditional Naga culture. The oral tradition is kept alive through folk tales and songs. Naga folk songs are both romantic and historical, with songs narrating entire stories of famous ancestors and incidents. There are also seasonal songs which describe activities done in an agricultural season. Ethnic dances of the Nagas give an insight into the inborn Naga reticence of the people. War dances and other dances belonging to distinctive Naga ethnic groups are a major art form in Nagaland.

Festivals 

Nagaland is known in India as the Land of Festivals. The diversity of people and ethnic groups, each with their own culture and heritage, creates a year-long atmosphere of celebrations. In addition, the state celebrates all Christian festivities. Traditional ethnic-related festivals revolve round agriculture, as a vast majority of the population of Nagaland is directly dependent on agriculture. Some of the significant festivals for each major ethnic groups are:

Hornbill Festival 

The Hornbill Festival was launched by the Government of Nagaland in December 2000 to encourage inter-ethnic interaction and to promote cultural heritage of the state. Organized by the State Tourism Department and Art & Culture Department. Hornbill Festival showcases a mix of cultural displays under one roof. This festival takes place between 1 and 10 December every year.

It is held at the Kisama Heritage Village which is about 12 km south of Kohima. All the ethnic groups of Nagaland take part in this festival. The aim of the festival is to revive and protect the rich culture of Nagaland and display its history, culture and traditions.

The festival is named after the hornbill bird, which is displayed in folklores in most of the state's ethnic groups. The week-long festival unites Nagaland and people enjoy the colourful performances, crafts, sports, food fairs, games, and ceremonies. Traditional arts which include paintings, wood carvings, and sculptures are on display. Festival highlights include traditional Naga Morungs exhibition and sale of arts and crafts, food stalls, herbal medicine stalls, shows and sales, cultural medley – songs and dances, fashion shows, beauty contest, traditional archery, naga wrestling, indigenous games, and musical concerts. Additional attractions include the Konyak fire eating demonstration, pork-fat eating competitions, the Hornbill Literature Festival (including the Hutton Lectures), Hornbill Global Film Fest, Hornbill Ball, Choral Panorama, North East India Drum Ensemble, Naga King Chilli eating competition, Hornbill National Rock Contest, Hornbill International Motor Rally and WW-II Vintage Car Rally.

Traditional sports 

Kene

Kene or Naga wrestling is a folk wrestling style and traditional sport of the Nagas. The objective of the sport is to bring any part of the opponent's body above the knee to the ground.

Aki Kiti

Aki Kiti or Sümi kick fighting is a traditional combat sport originating from and was practiced by the Sümi Nagas. It is characterized by kicking and blocking solely using the soles of the feet. The sporting event served the purpose of righting wrongs, restoring honour, or "settling scores" between tribes and tribesmen without resorting to violence. It was practiced during tribal ceremonies.

Cuisine

Nagaland is home to the Naga Morich or Raja Mircha (King Chilli), one of the hottest chilis in the world at 855,000 SHU on the Scoville scale. All the ethnic groups of Nagaland have their own cuisine, and they use a lot of meat, fish, and fermented products in their dishes. However, the state dish is smoked pork cooked with fermented soya bean. Naga dishes use a lot of locally grown herbs, ghost peppers, ginger, and garlic. Famous dishes include snails cooked with pork and silkworm larvae, which is an expensive delicacy of the state. Galho is a vegetarian porridge cooked with rice, leaves, and condiments. Drinks include Zutho and Thutse, beers made with sticky rice.

Historical rituals

Feasts of Merit
In Naga society, individuals were expected to find their place in the social hierarchy, and prestige was the key to maintaining or increasing social status. To achieve these goals a man, whatever his ascendancy, had to be a headhunter or great warrior, have many sexual conquests among women, or complete a series of merit feasts.

The Feasts of Merit reflected the splendor and celebration of Naga life. Only married men could give such Feasts, and his wife took a prominent and honoured place during the ritual which emphasised male-female co-operation and interdependence. His wife brewed the beer which he offered to the guests. The event displayed ceremonies and festivities organised by the sponsor. The Feast given by a wealthier community person would be more extravagant. He would typically invite everyone from the ethnic group. This event bestowed honour to the couple from the community. After the Feast, the tribe would give the couple rights to ornaments equally.

Education 

Nagaland's schools are run by the state and central government or by a private organisation. Instruction is mainly in English — the official language of Nagaland. Under the 10+2+3 plan, after passing the Higher Secondary Examination (the grade 12 examination), students may enroll in general or professional degree programs.

Nagaland has three autonomous colleges:
 St. Joseph's College, Jakhama
 Kohima Science College, Jotsoma
 Patkai Christian College, Chümoukedima

Along with one central university—Nagaland University, one engineering college—National Institute of Technology, one College of Veterinary Science and Animal Husbandry in Jalukie and three private Universities—St. Joseph University, Northeast Christian University (NECU) and Institute of Chartered Financial Analysts of India University (ICFAI University).

Tourism 

Tourism experts contend that the state's uniqueness and strategic location in northeast India give Nagaland an advantage in tapping into the tourism sector for economic growth. The state has been extremely successful in promoting the great Hornbill Festival, which attracts Indian and foreign tourists alike.
The key thrusts of Nagaland's tourism are its rich culture, showcasing of history and wildlife. Tourism infrastructure is rapidly improving and experts contend this is no longer an issue as was in the past. Local initiatives and tourism pioneers are now beginning to promote a socially responsible tourism model involving the participation of the councils, village elders, the church and the youth.

See also 

 Naga Self-Administered Zone in Myanmar.
 Outline of Nagaland
 Index of Nagaland-related articles
 Kohima

References

Further reading 
 
 Drouyer, A. Isabel, René Drouyer, "THE NAGAS: MEMORIES OF HEADHUNTERS- Indo-Burmese Borderlands-vol. 1", White lotus, 2016, .
 Glancey, Jonathan. 2011. Nagaland: a Journey to India's Forgotten Frontier. London: Faber
 Hattaway, Paul. 2006. 'From Head Hunters To Church Planters'. Authentic Publishing
 Hutton, J. 1986. 'Report on Naga Hills' Delhi: Mittal Publication.
 Kunz, Richard & Vibha Joshi. 2008. Naga – A Forgotten Mountain Region Rediscovered. Basel: Merian.
 Oppitz, Michael, Thomas Kaiser, Alban von Stockhausen & Marion Wettstein. 2008. Naga Identities: Changing Local Cultures in the Northeast of India. Gent: Snoeck Publishers.
 Stirn, Aglaja & Peter van Ham. The Hidden world of the Naga: Living Traditions in Northeast India. London: Prestel.
 von Stockhausen, Alban. 2014. Imag(in)ing the Nagas: The Pictorial Ethnography of Hans-Eberhard Kauffmann and Christoph von Fürer-Haimendorf. Arnoldsche, Stuttgart, .

External links 

Government
 
 Official Tourism Site of Nagaland
 Department of Power Nagaland

General information
 Nagaland Encyclopædia Britannica entry
 
 

 
1963 establishments in India
English-speaking countries and territories
Northeast India
States and territories established in 1963
States and union territories of India